La rencontre imprévue, ou Les pèlerins de la Mecque Wq. 32 (The Unexpected Encounter, or The Pilgrims to Mecca) is a three-act opéra comique, composed in 1763 by Christoph Willibald Gluck to a libretto by Louis Dancourt after the 1726 comédie en vaudeville Les pèlerins de la Mecque by Alain-René Lesage and d'Orneval. The death of Isabella of Parma, the archduke's wife, occasioned a revision of the spoken text downplaying the feigned death by which princess Rezia tests her beloved.  The work was first performed in this form as La rencontre imprévue at the Burgtheater, Vienna on 7 January 1764. Dancourt's original text, titled Les pèlerins de la Mecque and designated as a comédie mêlée d'ariettes, was not premiered until 1990 (see Recordings).

Performance history
Gluck's longest opéra-comique and considered his finest, La rencontre imprévue was his most popular work in the genre in the 18th century. It was performed in French in Brussels (1766), Bordeaux (as Ali et Rezia, 19 May 1766), Amsterdam (1768), The Hague (1768), Mannheim (1768), Copenhagen (1772), Liège (23 December 1776), Cassel (1780), Lille (17 November 1783), and Marseille (1784). It was translated into German as Die unvermuthete Zusammenkunft oder Die Pilgrimme von Mecca and performed in Frankfurt (16 April 1771), Vienna (1776 at the Kärntnertor Theater; 26 July 1780 at the Burgtheater), Munich (9 March 1779), Berlin (17 October 1783, the first Gluck opera to be performed there), and many other cities.

The opera was first performed in Paris on 1 May 1790 by the Opéra-Comique at the first Salle Favart in an arrangement by Jean-Pierre Solié with the title Les fous de Médine, ou La rencontre imprévue. It was revived by the Opéra-Comique in Gluck's arrangement (as Les pèlerins de la Mecque) on 20 December 1906, and also produced at the Trianon Lyrique on 8 November 1923.

Legacy
La rencontre imprévue was adapted and supplied with new music by Haydn as L'incontro improvviso (1775) and the 1780 Vienna revival of Gluck's version presumably inspired the plot of Mozart's Die Entführung aus dem Serail. In 1784 Mozart wrote a set of variations for piano (K. 455) on Calender's aria "Unser dummer Pöbel meint" ("Les hommes pieusement"). In 1887 the variations were orchestrated by Tchaikovsky as the final movement of his orchestral Suite No. 4 Mozartiana.

Roles

Recordings
 Les pèlerins de la Mecque ou La rencontre imprévue (Dancourt's previously unperformed version, restored by Bruce Alan Brown): Lynne Dawson (Rezia); Claudine Le Coz (Balkis); Catherine Dubosc (Dardané); Sophie Marin-Degor (Amine); Guy de Mey (Ali); Jean-Luc Viala (Osmin); Guy Flechter (Le Sultan d'Égypte); Jean-Philippe Lafont (Vertigo); Gilles Cachemaille (Un calendar); Francis Dudziak (Le chef de caravane); Orchèstre de l'Opéra de Lyon, John Eliot Gardiner conductor; recorded in Auditorium Maurice Ravel, Lyon, 18–24 March 1990; Erato.

References
Notes

Sources
 Brown, Bruce Alan (1992). "La rencontre imprévue" in Sadie 1992, vol. 3, pp. 1288–1289.
 Loewenberg, Alfred (1978). Annals of Opera 1597–1940 (third edition, revised). Totowa, New Jersey: Rowman and Littlefield. .
 Rushton, Julian (2001). "Christoph Willibald Gluck", pp. 313–327, in The New Penguin Opera Guide, edited by Amanda Holden. London: Penguin Books. .
 Sadie, Stanley, editor (1992). The New Grove Dictionary of Opera (4 volumes). London: Macmillan. .
 Wild, Nicole; Charlton, David (2005). Théâtre de l'Opéra-Comique Paris: répertoire 1762–1972. Sprimont, Belgium: Editions Mardaga. .
 Wolff, Stéphane (1953). Un demi-siècle d'Opéra-Comique (1900–1950). Paris: André Bonne.

External links
Amazon review of John Eliot Gardiner's recording
 ms full score (n.d. [1764 or later]) at Gallica
 1767 libretto (Munich: Mayrin) at Google Books
 1768 libretto (The Hague: Constapel, et le Febure) at Google Books
 1776 libretto (Paris: Duchesne) at Google Books
 1780 libretto: Die unvermuthete Zusammenkunft oder die Pilgrime von Mecca (Vienna: Logenmeister) at the Internet Archive.

Operas by Christoph Willibald Gluck
French-language operas
Operas
Comédies mêlées d'ariettes
1764 operas
Opera world premieres at the Burgtheater